Flekkerøy or Flekkerøya is an island and residential district in Kristiansand municipality in Agder county, Norway. The district is located within the borough of Vågsbygd, and it consists of 4 main neighborhoods: Berge/Andås, Kjære, Lindebø/Skålevik, and Mæbø/Høyfjellet. The district covers all of the island of Flekkerøya which lies within the city of Kristiansand. The island has 3,632 inhabitants (as of 23 October 2013). Flekkerøy Church is located on the island.

History
Since the 15th century, Flekkerøy was an important harbour along the Skagerrak, and since 1540 it has been considered as the most important outport in the whole region of Southern Norway. In 1555, the first fortifications were built, but it was torn down in 1561. Anne of Denmark and James VI of Scotland came to Flekkerøy in 1589.

In the early 17th century, the harbour again became of strategic importance, and in 1635 the island was visited by King Christian IV who decided to build the Christiansø Fortress to protect the harbour. In 1656, a new fortress called Fredriksholm was built, and Christiansø soon decayed.

In 1807, about 250 people lived on the island, and in September 1807, English ships anchored at the harbour. The local people fled, Fredriksholm fortress was blown up, and the island was pillaged.  In 1848, a cannon battery was built, but in 1872 it was abandoned, and in 1874 the partially rebuilt Fredriksholm fortress was also closed down for good.

In 2005, the remaining military properties on Flekkerøya were secured for public outdoor recreation by the Ministry of Climate and Environment.

Politics
The 10 largest politics parties in Flekkerøy (2015):

Transportation
The main bus stop on the island is at the roundabout where County Road 457 ends. Line 07 is the local line on the island.

Media gallery

References

Geography of Kristiansand
Islands of Agder
Tourism in Kristiansand
Populated places in Agder